The 2017 Swiss Open Grand Prix Gold was the fifth Grand Prix's badminton tournament of the 2017 BWF Grand Prix Gold and Grand Prix. The tournament was held at the St. Jakobshalle in Basel, Switzerland on 14–19 March 2017 and had a total purse of $120,000.

Men's singles

Seeds

  Lin Dan (champion)
  Shi Yuqi (final)
  Ajay Jayaram (withdrew)
  Jonatan Christie (withdrew)
  H. S. Prannoy (quarterfinals)
  Wang Tzu-wei (semifinals)
  Huang Yuxiang (second round)
  Hsu Jen-hao (second round)
  Anders Antonsen (third round)
  Qiao Bin (third round)
  Zulfadli Zulkiffli (withdrew)
  Anthony Sinisuka Ginting (semifinals)
  Sameer Verma (second round)
  Brice Leverdez (third round)
  Ihsan Maulana Mustofa (quarterfinals)
  Emil Holst (quarterfinals)

Finals

Top half

Section 1

Section 2

Section 3

Section 4

Bottom half

Section 5

Section 6

Section 7

Section 8

Women's singles

Seeds

  Saina Nehwal (withdrew)
  Zhang Beiwen (second round)
  Chen Yufei (final)
  Liang Xiaoyu (withdrew)
  Hsu Ya-ching (first round)
  Linda Zetchiri (quarterfinals)
  Fitriani (semifinals)
  Chiang Mei-hui (second round)

Finals

Top half

Section 1

Section 2

Bottom half

Section 3

Section 4

Men's doubles

Seeds

  Chai Biao / Hong Wei (champion)
  Li Junhui / Liu Yuchen (second round)
  Kim Astrup / Anders Skaarup Rasmussen (quarterfinals)
  Marcus Ellis / Chris Langridge (semifinals)
  Chen Hung-ling / Wang Chi-lin (semifinals)
  Mathias Christiansen / David Daugaard (quarterfinals)
  Lu Ching-yao / Yang Po-han (second round)
  Fajar Alfian / Muhammad Rian Ardianto (quarterfinals)

Finals

Top half

Section 1

Section 2

Bottom half

Section 3

Section 4

Women's doubles

Seeds

  Chen Qingchen / Jia Yifan (champion)
  Puttita Supajirakul / Sapsiree Taerattanachai (quarterfinals)
  Vivian Hoo Kah Mun / Woon Khe Wei (quarterfinals)
  Gabriela Stoeva / Stefani Stoeva (final)
  Della Destiara Haris / Rosyita Eka Putri Sari (quarterfinals)
  Greysia Polii / Rizki Amelia Pradipta (second round)
  Maiken Fruergaard / Sara Thygesen (semifinals)
  Ni Ketut Mahadewi Istirani / Tiara Rosalia Nuraidah (first round)

Finals

Top half

Section 1

Section 2

Bottom half

Section 3

Section 4

Mixed doubles

Seeds

  Zheng Siwei / Chen Qingchen (semifinals)
  Praveen Jordan / Debby Susanto (final)
  Dechapol Puavaranukroh / Sapsiree Taerattanachai (champion)
  Pranaav Jerry Chopra / N. Sikki Reddy (quarterfinals)
  Zhang Nan / Li Yinhui (semifinals)
  Terry Hee Yong Kai / Tan Wei Han (quarterfinals)
  Mathias Christiansen / Sara Thygesen (quarterfinals)
  Ronald Alexander / Melati Daeva Oktavianti (first round)

Finals

Top half

Section 1

Section 2

Bottom half

Section 3

Section 4

References

External links 
 Tournament Link

Swiss Open (badminton)
BWF Grand Prix Gold and Grand Prix
Swiss Open
Swiss Open
Sports competitions in Basel